Jesús Evodio Velázquez Aguirre (born 2 February 1978) is a Mexican politician from the Party of the Democratic Revolution. From 2006 to 2009 he served as Deputy of the LX Legislature of the Mexican Congress representing Guerrero.

See also
 List of mayors of Acapulco (municipality)

References

1978 births
Living people
Politicians from Guerrero
Members of the Chamber of Deputies (Mexico)
Party of the Democratic Revolution politicians
21st-century Mexican politicians